Haminoea navicula is a species of gastropod belonging to the family Haminoeidae.

The species is found in Western Europe and Mediterranean.

References

navicula